Isobutylene (or 2-methylpropene) is a hydrocarbon with the chemical formula . It is a four-carbon branched alkene (olefin), one of the four isomers of butylene.  It is a colorless flammable gas, and is of considerable industrial value.

Production
Polymer and chemical grade isobutylene is typically obtained by dehydrating tertiary butyl alcohol (TBA) or catalytic dehydrogenation of isobutane (Catofin or similar processes). Gasoline additives methyl tert-butyl ether (MTBE) and ethyl tert-butyl ether (ETBE), respectively, are produced by reacting methanol or ethanol with isobutylene contained in butene streams from olefin steam crackers or refineries, or with isobutylene from dehydrated TBA. Isobutylene is not isolated from the olefin or refinery butene stream before the reaction, as separating the ethers from the remaining butenes is simpler. Isobutylene can also be produced in high purities by "back-cracking" MTBE or ETBE at high temperatures and then separating the isobutylene by distillation from methanol or 

Isobutylene is a byproduct in the ethenolysis of diisobutylene to prepare neohexene:

Uses
Isobutylene is used in the production of a variety of products. It is alkylated with butane to produce isooctane or dimerized to diisobutylene (DIB) and then hydrogenated to make isooctane, a fuel additive.  Isobutylene is also used in the production of methacrolein.  Polymerization of isobutylene produces butyl rubber (polyisobutylene or PIB).  Antioxidants such as butylated hydroxytoluene (BHT) and butylated hydroxyanisole (BHA) are produced by Friedel-Crafts alkylation of phenols with isobutylene.

tert-Butylamine is produced commercially by amination of isobutylene using zeolite catalysts:
NH3 + CH2=C(CH3)2 -> H2NC(CH3)3

Safety
Isobutylene is a highly flammable gas.

See also
Butyl rubber
Polythene
Polybutene

References

External links

Alkenes